, also simply known as the JMSDF Sasebo Naval Base, is a group of ports and land facilities of the Japan Maritime Self-Defense Force (JMSDF), which are scattered in multiple districts of Sasebo City, Kyushu, and where the Sasebo District Force are located.

Background 
On September 16, 1953, it was newly reorganized by the National Safety Agency's Coastal Safety Force with the mission of protecting the West Sea. When the Sasebo District Force was reorganized, the Coastal Security Force had nominated Sasebo from the beginning, but after the Pacific War, Sasebo City planned to transform into a peaceful industrial city under the Former Military Port City Conversion Law. Therefore, it was not always active in attracting guards. Imari City had been actively campaigning to attract guard bases there. Hoping to attract the force suddenly increased in Sasebo City, and they decided to provide the site of the former Navy Defense Force (Hizukushimachi), which had started to be developed as a fishery base. Eventually, Tokutaro Kimura, Commissioner of the Japan Coast Guard, visited Sasebo and Imari, and decided to set up a guard base in Sasebo.

The security area is west of Yamaguchi Prefecture on the Tsushima Strait and the Sea of Japan side, and west of Kagoshima Prefecture on the Pacific side. Fukuoka Prefecture, Saga Prefecture, Nagasaki Prefecture, Kumamoto Prefecture, Kagoshima Prefecture and Okinawa Prefecture, and the boundary between Shimane and Yamaguchi prefectures are drawn at 315 degrees from the intersection with the coastline. From the point where the border between Ube and Yamaguchi intersects with the coastline, the line where the border between Fukuoka and Oita intersects with the coastline, and the border between Miyazaki and Kagoshima intersects with the coastline. The coastal waters of these prefectures between the 170 degree line.

The main duties are security and defense in the security area in charge, disaster dispatch, logistical support for front units such as the Self Defense Fleet, removal and disposal of naval mines and explosive dangerous goods, and civil-military cooperation.

The force of the ships belonging to the Sasebo District Force consists of the 43rd Mine Warfare Force, deployed in the 3rd Missile Boat Corps and the Shimonoseki Base Corps, and the 46th Mine Warfare Force, deployed in the Okinawa Base Corps. As a force user (responsible for dealing with situations), they operate escort vessels and rotorcraft and provide the escort fleet and aviation groups to deal with situations.

In recent years, s have been deployed in sequence to prepare for craft ships to North Korea. In addition, on March 26, 2019, the Aiura Garrison Sakibe Branch was established in the Sakibe area, where the Ground Self-Defense Force Amphibious Rapid Deployment Brigade Combat Landing Battalion is stationed.

History
On 1 August 1952, he National Safety Agency Coastal Safety Force was established, and the Sasebo Route Enlightenment Corps was newly formed under the control of the Yokosuka District Force. On November 25 Sasebo City Council approves provision to the guards of the former garrison site in the Kurashima area.

On 28 August 1953, a general supervision department was set up for the southwestern part of the Guard in Sasebo. On September 16, the new edition of the Sasebo District Force of the Guard was created, established by the District General Administration Department and the Sasebo Base Guard. On November 14, the opening of the District General Administration Department at the site of the former garrison in the Kurashima area.

On 1 July 1954, the National Safety Agency Guard was reorganized into the Defense Agency Maritime Self-Defense Force. In March 1968, Sasebo District General Manager relocated to the current location.

On 3 November 1971, the Maritime Self-Defense Force observing ceremony was held in Sasebo. 45 ships and 61 aircraft participated.

On 15 October 1980, Self-Defense Force Sasebo Hospital was opened.

On March 31, 1986, marked the completion of the first pier for 5,000-ton class destroyers in the Hirase area.

In May 1989, the second pier in the Hirase area was completed.

In March 2019 the Ground Self-Defense Force Sakibe branch office opened in Sakibe district.

At the end of March 2021, the Self-Defense Forces Yokosuka Hospital abolished the Self-Defense Forces Sasebo Hospital due to the strengthening of its functions, and plans to reduce it to a clinic.

Facilities and operational units

Hirase District 
Sasebo District Force
Self-Defense Force Sasebo Hospital
Sasebo Communications Command
Sasebo District Police
Sasebo Music Corps
Fleet Escort Force
2nd Escort Flotilla
1st Escort Flotilla
4th Escort Flotilla
13th Escort Flotilla

Sakibe District 
Sasebo Education Corps
Sasebo Guard
3rd Missile Boat Flotilla
Sasebo Ammunition Maintenance Supply Station
Ground Self-Defense Force Sakibe Branch

Tategami District 
Sasebo Repair Supply Station
Sasebo Magnetic Measurement Station

Hidzukushi District 
Sasebo Base Business Corps
Mine Warfare Force
2nd Mine Warfare Force
Sasebo Maritime Training Guidance Team
Sasebo Sanitation Corps
MDSF Sasebo History Museum

See also
JMSDF Ōminato Naval Base
JMSDF Yokosuka Naval Base
JMSDF Maizuru Naval Base
JMSDF Kure Naval Base

References

External links
Sasebo Naval Base official website

Military installations established in 1953
1953 establishments in Japan
Sasebo